
Izquierda-Ezkerra (I-E) is a coalition in the constituency of Navarre, Spain. It was established in January 2011 after Batzarre split from the Nafarroa Bai coalition. Batzarre accepted United Left of Navarre's call to form a coalition along with Socialist local figures—the Plataforma Navarra por el Cambio—disgruntled with the Socialist Party's social policies and standing support to the conservative anti-Basque Unión del Pueblo Navarro (UPN). The Los Verdes-Grupo Verde ecologists joined them too.

In the elections to the Parliament of Navarre held on 22 May 2011, the coalition won three seats and 5.70% of the valid votes. The coalition defends an approach of "inclusion and coexistence", as opposed to exclusion and confrontational attitudes. The party also advocates for an alliance of leftist forces of Navarre and an end to UPN's on-off decades long tenure in office, as well as an understanding with leftist Basque nationalist parties. Their main strongholds lie in Pamplona and Tudela.

Composition

Electoral performance

Parliament of Navarre

Cortes Generales

Notes

References

External links
  

Socialist parties in the Basque Country (autonomous community)
Political party alliances in Spain
Political parties established in 2011
2011 establishments in Spain
United Left (Spain)